Brandon Schuster (born 23 April 1998 in Fiji) is a Samoan swimmer who represented Samoa at the 2016 Summer Olympics. He holds multiple Samoan records in swimming.

Personal life
Schuster is the son of Samoan politician Toeolesulusulu Cedric Schuster. He was educated at Robert Louis Stevenson School in Apia, and at California Baptist University, graduating with a Bachelor of Science in Biomedical Engineering in 2021.

Swimming career

2012
At the 2012 FINA World Swimming Championships (25 m) he competed in the 50m, 100m and 200 metre freestyle events, the 50m, 100m and 200 metre backstroke events, the 50m, 100m and 200 metre breaststroke events, and the 100 metre individual medley.

2013
He represented Samoa at the 2013 World Aquatics Championships, racing in the 400m and 800 metre freestyle events.

2014
He represented Samoa at the 2014 Commonwealth Games, competing in the 50m, 100m, 200m and 400 metre freestyle, the 200 metre breaststroke and the 200 metre individual medley.

At the 2014 FINA World Swimming Championships (25 m), he raced in the 50m, 100m, 200m and 400 metre freestyle and the 200 metre breaststroke.

2015
Schuster competed at the 2015 Pacific Games, winning bronze in the 200 metre backstroke, and silver in the 400 metre individual medley race. He set a national record in the 400 metre individual medley.

At the 2015 Commonwealth Youth Games, held in Samoa, Schuster finished 6th in the 400 metre individual medley.

He represented Samoa at the 2015 World Aquatics Championships, racing in the 200m and 400 metre freestyle events.

2016
At the 2016 Oceania Swimming Championships, he won bronze in the 400 metre individual medley race, breaking his national record in the process. He also competed in the 400m, 200 metre individual medley and 5 km races.

At the 2016 Summer Olympics he competed in the Men's 200 m freestyle, where he ranked 46th with a time of 1:57.72. He did not advance to the semifinals.

2016 started competing with California Baptist University

2017

Competed at the NCAA division 2 Championships in Alabama for the California Baptist University and placed 4th in the 400im.

At the 2017 World Aquatics Championships in Budapest, Hungary he competed in the men's 200 freestyle and 400im.

2018

Competed at the 2018 Commonwealth Games for team Samoa and swam the 50, 100, 200 and 400 freestyle. As well as the 200 and 400 Individual Medley. He set Samoan records in the 50, 100 and 400 freestyle.

2019

Competed in the 2019 Pacific Games for team Samoa and was one of the Games torch runners for the opening.  He competed in multiple swimming events medaling with Gold for the 200 Backstroke and 400 Individual Medly, Silver in the 200 IM, as well as receiving Bronze in the 400 Freestyle and 200 Breaststroke. He was named and awarded the "Male Athlete of the 2019 Pacific Games" for his accolades in Samoa swimming and being a cornerstone in Pacific swimming development. He then competed at eh FINA World Aquatics Championships swimming in the 400 IM and 200 IM.

At the ANOC Awards 2019 held in Doha, Qatar he was awarded with the "Best Male Athlete in Oceania" for 2019. He was subsequently named one of the Samoa Observer's 2019 "people of the year".

References

External links
 

1998 births
Living people
Olympic swimmers of Samoa
Swimmers at the 2016 Summer Olympics
Commonwealth Games competitors for Samoa
Swimmers at the 2014 Commonwealth Games
Swimmers at the 2018 Commonwealth Games
Swimmers at the 2022 Commonwealth Games
Male medley swimmers
Samoan male swimmers
Sportspeople from Apia
Samoan male freestyle swimmers
Male backstroke swimmers
Male breaststroke swimmers
California Baptist University alumni